Bulgarian–British relations are foreign relations between Bulgaria and the United Kingdom. Both countries established diplomatic relations in July 1879 as Bulgaria achieved its independence from the Ottoman Empire. The two nations were enemies during the First World War, most of the Second World War, and the Cold War. Relations since 1989 have been very friendly between the two nations.  Bulgaria has an embassy in London, and the United Kingdom have an embassy in Sofia.  
Both countries are full members of NATO and Council of Europe

Royal Visits to Bulgaria 
 King Edward VIII of the United Kingdom
 9 September 1936: Sofia
 The Duke of Edinburgh
 October 1973: Varna
 The Prince of Wales
 6–8 November 1998: Sofia and Plovdiv
 13–14 March 2003: Sofia and Varna
 The Duke of York
 17–19 October 2001: Sofia
 The Earl of Wessex and The Countess of Wessex
 23–24 June 2013: Sofia
 The Duke of Kent
 7–9 April 2014: Sofia and Plovdiv

See also 
 Foreign relations of Bulgaria
 Foreign relations of the United Kingdom 
 EU–UK relations
 Bulgarians in the United Kingdom
 British in Bulgaria
 Embassy of Bulgaria, London

Notes

Further reading
 Leonard, Glenn. "Economics, Diplomacy, and War: Britain and Bulgaria, 1936–38," Canadian Journal of History (2012) 47#3 pp 597–622.

External links 
   Bulgarian embassy in London
  UK and Bulgaria - UK and the world - GOV.UK
   British embassy in Sofia

 
United Kingdom
Bilateral relations of the United Kingdom